Tinea xenodes is a moth of the family Tineidae. It is known from Bolivia.

This species has a wingspan of 8–10 mm. The forewings are fuscous suffusedly irrorated (sprinkled) with dark fuscous. There is a small whitish-ochreous spot on the costa at five-sixths. The hindwings are rather dark bronzy fuscous.

References

Tineinae
Moths described in 1909
Moths of South America